Trophonopsis aberrans is a species of sea snail, a marine gastropod mollusk in the family Muricidae, the murex snails or rock snails.

References

External links
 Houart R. (1991) Description of thirteen new species of Muricidae (Gastropoda) from Australia and the New Caledonian region, with range extensions to South Africa. Journal of the Malacological Society of Australia 12: 35-55

Trophonopsis
Gastropods described in 1991